Ismail bin Mohamed Said (Jawi: إسماعيل بن محمد سعيد; born 7 September 1965) is a Malaysian politician who served as the Deputy Minister of Home Affairs I for the second term in the Barisan Nasional (BN) administration under former Prime Minister Ismail Sabri Yaakob and former Minister Hamzah Zainuddin from August 2021 to the collapse of the BN administration in November 2022 and the first term in the Perikatan Nasional (PN) administration under former Prime Minister Muhyiddin Yassin and former Minister Hamzah from March 2020 to the collapse of the BN administration in August 2021, Member of Parliament (MP) for Kuala Krau from March 2004 to November 2022, the Deputy Speaker of the Dewan Rakyat in the BN administration from under former Prime Minister Najib Razak and former Speaker Pandikar Amin Mulia from June 2013 to May 2018. He is a member of the United Malays National Organisation (UMNO), a component party of the BN coalition. He is also former Chairman of the Perbadanan Tabung Pendidikan Tinggi Nasional (PTPTN). 

Ismail was elected to Parliament in the 2004 election, winning the UMNO-held seat of Kuala Krau, and was re-elected in 2008 and 2013. Before entering Parliament, Ismail was an official in UMNO's youth wing and operated a law firm in Temerloh.

Election results

Honours

Honours of Malaysia
  :
 Officer of the Order of the Defender of the Realm (KMN) (2006)
  Commander of the Order of Meritorious Service (PJN) – Datuk (2014)
  :
 Knight Companion of the Order of the Crown of Pahang (DIMP) – Dato' (2008)
  Knight Companion of the Order of Sultan Ahmad Shah of Pahang (DSAP) – Dato' (2013)
  Grand Knight of the Order of Sultan Ahmad Shah of Pahang (SSAP) – Dato' Sri (2015)

References

Living people
1965 births
People from Pahang
Malaysian people of Malay descent
Malaysian Muslims
United Malays National Organisation politicians
Members of the Dewan Rakyat
21st-century Malaysian politicians
Officers of the Order of the Defender of the Realm
Commanders of the Order of Meritorious Service